Esteban Crespo (born 13 April 1911, date of death unknown) was a Mexican athlete. He competed in the men's long jump at the 1932 Summer Olympics.

References

External links
 

1911 births
Year of death missing
Athletes (track and field) at the 1932 Summer Olympics
Mexican male long jumpers
Olympic athletes of Mexico
Place of birth missing